
Gmina Świebodzin is an urban-rural gmina (administrative district) in Świebodzin County, Lubusz Voivodeship, in western Poland.

Villages
Apart from the town of Świebodzin, Gmina Świebodzin contains the villages and settlements of Borów, Chociule, Glińsk, Gościkowo, Grodziszcze, Jeziory, Jordanowo, Kępsko, Krzemionka, Kupienino, Leniwka, Lubinicko, Lubogóra, Ługów, Miłkowo, Niedźwiady, Nowy Dworek, Osogóra, Podjezierze, Podlesie, Raków, Rosin, Rozłogi, Rudgerzowice, Rusinów, Rzeczyca, Wilkowo, Witosław, Wityń and Wygon.

Neighbouring gminas
Gmina Świebodzin is bordered by the gminas of Lubrza, Międzyrzecz, Skąpe, Sulechów, Szczaniec and Trzciel.

Twin towns – sister cities

Gmina Świebodzin is twinned with:
 Friesoythe, Germany
 Herzberg, Germany
 Neuenhagen bei Berlin, Germany

References

Swiebodzin
Świebodzin County